Corrientes  is a city in Argentina.

Corrientes (currents in the Spanish language) may also refer to:

 Corrientes Province, including the city of Corrientes
 Corriente River, in this province
 Avenida Corrientes in Buenos Aires, Argentina
 Corrientes (Buenos Aires Underground), a railway station
 Cabo Corrientes (municipality), a municipality in Jalisco, Mexico
 Cabo Corrientes, Chocó, a cape on the Pacific coast of Colombia
 Cabo Corrientes, Cuba, a cape in the extreme west of Cuba
 Cabo Corrientes, Jalisco, a cape in Jalisco, Mexico
 Cabo Corrientes, Mar del Plata, a cape in Argentina
 Carysfort, Falkland Islands, known as Cabo Corrientes in Spanish
 , two Donaldson Line ships with this name